The 2010 Minnesota State Auditor election was held on Tuesday, November 2, 2010 to elect the Minnesota State Auditor for a four-year term. Incumbent Rebecca Otto of the Minnesota Democratic–Farmer–Labor Party (DFL) was re-elected to a second term.

Candidates

Democratic–Farmer–Labor Party
Incumbent Rebecca Otto won endorsement at the Minnesota Democratic–Farmer–Labor Party (DFL) convention.

Republican Party
Former State Auditor Patricia Anderson earned the endorsement of the Republican Party of Minnesota at its state convention.

Green Party
Minneapolis Park and Recreation Board member Annie Young ran as the Green Party candidate.

Grassroots Party
Kenny Kalligher stood for election for the Grassroots Party.

Results

References

External links
 Minnesota Secretary of State - Elections & Voting

2010 Minnesota elections
Minnesota State Auditor elections
November 2010 events in the United States
Minnesota